Sokoura (Sò-kúrá) is a small town and commune in the Cercle of Bankass in the Mopti Region of Mali. In 1998 the commune had a population of 26,478.

A Manding dialect is spoken in the town.

References

Communes of Mopti Region